Arlington Municipal Airport  is five miles south of Arlington, in Tarrant County, Texas. The airport is at the intersection of Interstate 20 and South Collins Road; it is a reliever airport for Dallas/Fort Worth International Airport and Dallas Love Field.

Several companies operate aircraft services on the airport property, including the Bell Helicopter division of Textron.

Most U.S. airports use the same three-letter location identifier for the FAA and IATA, but this airport GKY to the FAA and has no IATA code.

Facilities
Its single runway, 16/34, is 6,080 by 100 feet (1,853 x 30 m) concrete.

In 2006 the airport had 151,600 aircraft operations, average 415 per day: 97% general aviation, 3% air taxi and <1% military. 250 aircraft were then based at this airport: 70% single-engine,  22% multi-engine, 6% helicopter and 2% jet.

References

External links
 Arlington Municipal Airport, official site
 
 

Airports in the Dallas–Fort Worth metroplex
Airports in Tarrant County, Texas
Buildings and structures in Arlington, Texas

Airports in Texas